Shahnawaz Rana (born 14 March 1976) is an Indian businessman, politician and former member of the Uttar Pradesh Legislative Assembly from the Bijnor Assembly constituency.

Rana, a member of the Rashtriya Lok Dal and the Bahujan Samaj Party was elected as member of the State Legislative Assembly in 2007 from the Bijnor assembly seat. He defeated candidate Kunwar Bharatendra Singh of the Bharatiya Janata Party in a very close contest.

In 2012, Rana stood for reelection to the Assembly, but was unsuccessful, polling fewer votes than both the winning candidate, Kunvar Bharatendra Singh and the runner up, Mahboob.

Rana is editor-in-chief of the newspaper Shahtimes, one of his family's business enterprises.

Controversies 
In 2017, an audio record of a phone call between Junaid Raza and Shahnawaz Rana went viral. Rana is alleged to have told Raza that he committed a murder when aged twelve. Rana however refuted the voice to be his.

References

Further reading 
 
 
 

1976 births
Living people
Uttar Pradesh MLAs 2007–2012
People from Bijnor
Bahujan Samaj Party politicians from Uttar Pradesh
People from Bijnor district